Richard H. Linton (born 1964) is an American educator and presently serves as the fifteenth President of Kansas State University.

Career
Linton first served as a professor of food science at Purdue University (1994–2011). From 2011 to 2012, he served as department chair of food science and technology at Ohio State University. In 2012, he became dean of the College of Agriculture and Life Science at North Carolina State University, a position he held for 10 years. The Kansas Board of Regents selected Linton to serve as the fifteenth president of Kansas State University on December 2, 2021.

Kansas State University
On February 14, 2022, Linton began his service as president of Kansas State University.

Footnotes

1964 births
Living people

Presidents of Kansas State University
Virginia Tech alumni
Purdue University faculty